The Konica Cup was a football cup competition in Japan, run by the Japan Soccer League as a prelude to the 1992 Summer Olympics. Only JSL First Division clubs were allowed to compete. Along with the JSL Cup it was a predecessor to the J. League Cup, but also involving the Japanese Olympic and Youth teams. The J. League Cup would later copy the format of a cup having only top division teams. No draws were allowed, instead draws were settled by extra time and penalty kicks.

1990

Group A

Group B

Semifinals:
Yomiuri 5 ANA 0
Yamaha 2 Toshiba 0

Final: Yamaha Motor 1 Yomiuri 2

1991
This season the Japanese youth team sat out.

Group A

Group B

Semifinals:
Nissan Motors 0 Toyota Motor 2
JR Furukawa 0 Honda Motor 1

Final: Toyota Motor 6 (a.e.t.) Honda Motor 5

Sources
Contents of Domestic Competition of Football in Japan

Defunct football cup competitions in Japan
Japan Soccer League
1990 in Japanese football
1991 in Japanese football